Smurf: Rescue in Gargamel's Castle is a 1982 video game published and developed by Coleco for the ColecoVision and Atari 2600. The game is based on the television series The Smurfs. In the game, the player must brave a series of obstacles to rescue Smurfette from Gargamel's castle.

Gameplay 

Gargamel has kidnapped Smurfette.  As a Smurf, the player has to walk from the Smurf village through a forest and a cave on the way to Gargamel's castle, where Smurfette awaits rescue. The player has an energy bar that slowly depletes over time.

Each side-scrolling screen presents various obstacles that the player must precisely jump over (e.g. fences, stalagmites) or land upon (e.g. ledges). Failure to execute any jump results in instant death. Higher difficulty levels introduce flying bats and spiders that the player must also avoid.

The ColecoVision version of Smurf: Rescue in Gargamel's Castle contains Easter eggs - initials may appear onscreen when moving between screens, and the player will receive hundreds of thousands of points, when moving between two forest screens.

Two of the background music tracks are "Simple Gifts" and the first movement of Ludwig van Beethoven's 6th Symphony, the "Pastoral".

Reception 
Creative Computing Video & Arcade Games said in 1983 that Smurf for ColecoVision was "truly good fun", approving of its graphics. The magazine stated that the game was suitable for very young children and older ones, reporting that neighborhood kids "loved it. I almost had to evict them from my house at night so I could get a game in before going to sleep". The ColecoVision version was reviewed in Video magazine in its "Arcade Alley" column where it was praised as utilizing "the best audiovisuals in the entire [ColecoVision] line". The visuals were described as "what amounts to the video-game equivalent of a Saturday-morning cartoon show", and the audio was described as "sophisticated" with nuanced sounds such as ominous organ music and the "muted echo" accompaniment to standard leaps. The reviewers also cautioned players to "prepare for frustration" until they learned how to accurately judge leaps.

The game was given the award for "Best Video Game Audiovisual Effects" at the 4th annual Arkie Awards.

References

External links 

 Video demonstration of Smurf: Rescue in Gargamel's Castle
 

The Smurfs video games
1982 video games
Atari 2600 games
ColecoVision games
Platform games
Video games developed in the United States
Single-player video games